Jessie Con-ui (born January 17, 1977) is an American criminal who, when a prisoner at United States Penitentiary, Canaan for a 2013 murder and conspiracy to commit murder, killed a corrections officer. He was serving time at the penitentiary for a gang murder he committed in Arizona. Con-ui's criminal past is lengthy, being arrested in California, Arizona, New Mexico and Pennsylvania. His charges include dozens of charges of drug use, distribution, trafficking, aggravated assault, robbery, attempted murder and murder.

Criminal past
Con-ui was at Canaan serving an 11-year prison sentence stemming from a 2003 guilty plea for his role in a drug ring run by the New Mexican Mafia prison gang. Following that sentence, he was set to begin serving a life sentence after pleading guilty in 2008 to first-degree murder in Arizona.

In that case, Con-ui allegedly baited friend and fellow gang member Carlos Garcia into meeting him at a Phoenix laundromat. There, two men ambushed and shot Garcia, who managed to slip away before one of the men fired four rounds into his head.

Court documents claim Con-ui also agreed to or participated in several separate, uncharged incidents while incarcerated between 1999 and 2010, including stabbing another inmate with a homemade knife and assaulting another inmate with a food tray.

While out of jail in 2013, court documents allege Con-ui agreed to participate in the murder of a law enforcement officer but was arrested in Arizona before the murder could be carried out.

Murder of Eric Williams
Con-ui was incarcerated at United States Penitentiary, Canaan from 2009 until the stabbing in 2013.

On 25 February 2013, Con-ui kicked corrections officer Eric Williams down a flight of stairs. Con-ui then descending the stairs pulled out 2 shanks made out of an unknown object, he then attacked Williams for 11 minutes, while other prisoners watched, none stopping Con-ui. Williams was stabbed 203 times, his body having been kicked dozens of times and head slammed into the floor, killing him.

Finally, a fellow corrections officer who entered looking for Williams found him at the bottom of the stairs with Con-ui standing over Williams' body. First Aid was administered by other corrections staff, but was unsuccessful.  Williams' body was transported to an area hospital and Con-ui was immediately taken into custody.

Con-ui was asked by another officer why he did it, with Con-ui simply responding "He disrespected me."

Murder trial
Con-ui was jailed at ADX Florence, a super-maximum federal prison in Fremont County, Colorado, nicknamed the “Alcatraz of the Rockies.”

Con-ui's trial began on June 5, 2017 with opening statements being held at the Federal Courthouse in Scranton, Pennsylvania. During the first day a 12-minute video showing the graphic attack was played in front of the court room. Con-ui was seen having his eyes covered by his hands and the Williams family left prior to the video stating "We didn't want to see our son, husband and friend like that."

Assistant U.S. Attorney Francis Sempa told the jury, "Eric Williams was two hours from shift end and going home. He never made it home."

Defense attorneys fully admitted to jurors that "Jessie is guilty of murder beyond all doubt" and focused on trying to keep him from being sentenced to death. On July 10, 2017 the jury found Con-ui guilty, however the death penalty could not be agreed on by the jury and his sentence was automatically reduced to life in prison without the possibility for parole.

References

Living people
1977 births
American people convicted of murder
Gang members
American male criminals
21st-century American criminals
Inmates of ADX Florence
Prisoners sentenced to life imprisonment by the United States federal government